The Haunted is a 1991 American made-for-television haunted house film directed by Robert Mandel and starring Sally Kirkland, who received a Golden Globe nomination for her performance. The film depicts the events surrounding the Smurl haunting.

Plot
Janet Smurl and her family move into an old mansion in the town of Pittston, Pennsylvania, which is rumored to be haunted. Indeed, soon family members begin to pursue a variety of threatening phenomena. Strange human shadows wandering around the house, ominous sounds coming through the night, a stench spreading through the house, stains appearing on their own on the walls. But Janet cannot come to terms with the fact that someone is persistently forcing the family to leave the mansion. Eventually, Janet turns to her neighbors, the Warren family, for help, who seem to know a lot more about the house than they let on.

Cast
Sally Kirkland as Janet Smurl
Jeffrey DeMunn as Jack Smurl
Louise Latham as Mary Smurl
George D. Wallace as John Smurl
Joyce Van Patten as Cora Miller
Stephen Markle as Ed Warren
Diane Baker as Lorraine Warren
Cassie Yates as Dorie Hayden
John O'Leary as Father Larson
Hope Garber as Aunt Lily
Benj Thall as Kid
Claudette Roche as Reporter #2
John Asher as Joe
Allison Barron as Katie
Krista Murphy as Colleen
Ashley Bank as Shawn

Reception

Awards and nominations

References

External links
 
  
 

1991 television films
1991 films
Films directed by Robert Mandel
American television films
American haunted house films
American ghost films
Films set in 1975
Films set in 1985
Films set in Pennsylvania
Horror films based on actual events
1990s English-language films
1990s American films